Ant Raid is a Plants vs. Zombies style iOS game developed by Finnish indie studio Prank and released July 6, 2011.

Critical reception
The game has received a rating of 90% on Metacritic, based on 8 critic reviews.

References

2011 video games
IOS games
IOS-only games
Real-time strategy video games
Video games developed in Finland